Casas de Lázaro is a municipality in Albacete, Castile-La Mancha, Spain. It has a population of 441.

Municipalities of the Province of Albacete